The fourth competition weekend of the 2022–23 ISU Speed Skating World Cup was held at the Olympic Oval in Calgary, Canada, from Friday, 16 December, until Sunday, 18 December 2022.

Medal summary

Men's events

 In mass start, race points are accumulated during the race based on results of the intermediate sprints and the final sprint. The skater with most race points is the winner.

Women's events

 In mass start, race points are accumulated during the race based on results of the intermediate sprints and the final sprint. The skater with most race points is the winner.

Results

Men's events

500 m
The race started on 17 December 2022 at 13:11.

1000 m
The race started on 18 December 2022 at 14:22.

1500 m
The race started on 16 December 2022 at 12:30.

10000 m
The race started on 17 December 2022 at 13:50.

Mass start
The race started on 18 December 2022 at 15:24.

Team sprint
The race started on 16 December 2022 at 14:54.

Women's events

500 m
The race started on 16 December 2022 at 13:10.

1000 m
The race started on 18 December 2022 at 13:47.

1500 m
The race started on 17 December 2022 at 12:30.

5000 m
The race started on 16 December 2022 at 13:49.

Mass start
The race started on 18 December 2022 at 15:05.

Team sprint
The race started on 17 December 2022 at 15:44.

References

ISU World Cup, 2022–23, 4

4
ISU Speed Skating World Cup, 2022–23, World Cup 4
ISU
ISU